Norbert H. J. Nozy (born 9 September 1952 in Halen, Belgium) is a contemporary Belgian conductor, music educator, and classical saxophonist.

Education 
Nozy was introduced to music at a young age through his father, Norbert Nozy, who was in a local band.   Nozy studied at the Royal Conservatory of Brussels and at the Lemmens Institute in Leuven. He won first prizes in music theory, transposition, percussion, chamber music, harmony, counterpoint and the higher diploma saxophone.

Nozy studied conducting with Andre Vandernoot, Yvon Ducène, Leonce Gras and Jean-Sebastien Bereau of the Conservatoire de Paris. He studied fugue with Victor Legley.

Nozy was also recognized as an exceptional saxophonist. In 1970 he was Pro Civitate laureate of the International Gaudeamus Competition for Contemporary Music in Rotterdam in 1973, the Stravinsky Seminar for young conductors, organized by the National Opera in 1975.

Saxophonist 

He was a member of the Saxophone Quartet of Belgium ("Le Quatuor Belge de Saxophones") and Saxophone Ensemble from 1972 to 1975 and represented Belgium at several international conferences and symposia including saxophone in Bordeaux, London, Chicago, Washington, D.C., Luxembourg, Maastricht, Ghent, and Brussels.

For the academic year 1973 to 1974 he was a visiting lecturer and teacher at the University of North Texas College of Music, the same year that Jim Riggs began teaching saxophone at North Texas.

Conductor 
In 1975 he was hired as a saxophonist in the Royal Symphonic Band of the Belgian Guides. After great success to the tests of Kapellmeister, he directed the Military Band of the Belgian First Corps in Cologne. From February 1, 1985 he was the head of the Royal Symphonic Band of the Belgian Guides and held this position until 2003.

From 1983 to 1985 he served as conductor of the Harmonieorkest St. Michaël Thorn. Since June 27, 2004 he has been the conductor of the Koninklijke Harmonie of Thorn. He is also chief conductor of the Royal Netherlands Army Band "Johan Willem Friso" in Assen.

He won European Championships in London in 1988 conducting The Wind Band Saint Michael of Thorn, in 2003 in Venlo and in 2016 in Utrecht conducting The Royal Symphonic Band of Thorn.

Teacher 

Nozy has taught at the Maastricht Academy of Music and the Lemmens Institute in Leuven.  He has led seminars on the musical Les Rièzes et les Sarts to Cul-des-Sarts. Nozy teaches saxophone and wind band, at the Royal Conservatory of Brussels, where he also directs the orchestra of the conservatory. He gives master classes at home and abroad.

Juror 

He is also a juror in international competitions, including (i) the World Music Festival (WMC) in Kerkrade, (ii) the Tenuto Competition in Brussels, and (iii) the Saxophone Festival in Dinant, the Certamen in Valencia, the Maria Callas Competition in Athens, Coups de Vents Competition in Lille etc.

Selected discography 
 Portrait of Paul Golson, Anthology of Flemish Band Music, part 1
 Tracks 1–4 Brass Band Buizingen, conducted by Luc Vertommen
 Tracks 5–8 Royal Symphonic Band of the Belgian Guides, conducted by Norbert Nozy
 Soloist, Norbert Nozy (saxophone)
 Portrait of Marcel Poot, Anthology of Flemish Band Music, part 2
 Tracks 1–7: Brass Band Buizingen, conducted by Luc Vertommen
 Tracks 8–13:  Royal Symphonic Band of the Belgian Guides, conducted by Norbert Nozy
 Legley: Works for Symphonic Band, (CD), René Gailly International Productions (Nov 19, 1996)
Royal Symphonic Band of the Belgian Guides, Norbert Nozy, conductor

 "Ida Gotkovsky" Concerto for Symphonic Band, Poème de feu, Concerto pour Saxophone, soloist Jean Leclercq. Royal Symphonic Band of the Belgian Guides. Conductor Norbert Nozy.

 "Belgian Music for Symphonic Band" Richard III: Paul Gilson, Roumaniana:Jean Absil, Symphony nr. 7: Vic Legley, Danse Funambulesque:Jules Strens. Belgian Guides Orchestra. Conductor Norbert Nozy.

 "Piotr Tchaikovsy" 1812, Romeo and Juliet, Italian capriccio, Slavonic March. Royal Belgian Guides Orchestra. Conductor Norbert Nozy

 "60-40" Anniversary CD for King Baudouin. Eclosions J.M.Simonis, Symphonynr.4 J.Louel, Mouvements F. Glorieux. Soloist Robert Groslot. Belgian Guides Orchestra. Conductor Norbert Nozy.

 "Ida Gotkovsky" Fanfare, Symphonie de Printemps, Symphonie Brillante, Chant de la Forêt. Choirs Ex Tempore,(F.Heyerick) and Vivente Voce (Philippe Benoit),Royal Belgian Guides Orchestra. Conductor Norbert Nozy

 "Dunamis" Works by A. Waignein, piano C. Müller, saxophone V. Cornil. Belgian Guides Orchestra. Conductor Norbert Nozy.

 "Igor Stravinsky: Concerto for Piano and Winds, Joseph Jongen: Prelude and Variations for Piano, Alex De Taye: Triptyque Dramatique. Soloist Evgueny Moguilevsky. Royal Belgian Guides Orchestra. Conductor Norbert Nozy.

 " J.S.Bach" Toccata und Fuga, Pastorale in F, Concerto nr.3 in C for Organ, Aria, Sinfonia. Royal Belgian Guides Orchestra. Norbert Nozy.

 " Symphonie Fantastique" Hector Berlioz. Royal Belgian Guides Orchestra. Conductor Norbert Nozy.

 "Fire Storm" Works by J. Van der Roost, D. Brossé, Stephen Bulla. Royal Guides Orchestra. Conductor Norbert Nozy.

 "N. Rimsky-Korsakov" Concertstück für Clarinet und Bläser, soloist Walter Boeykens, Variations for oboe and Military Band, soloist Joris Van Den Hauwe, Concerto in B flat for Trombone and Band, soloist Michel Becquet. Royal Guides Orchestra. Conductor Norbert Nozy.

 "Nuts" Jerico, Fanfare for the Common Man, Rhapsodie in bleu, soloist Marc Matthys, Candide Ouverture, Three Dance Episodes, Festival Variations. Royal Belgian Guides Orchestra. Conductor Norbert Nozy.

 "Franz Constant" Concerto for accordion and Symphonic Band, soloist F. Guérouet, Fantasia for Saxophone and Orchestra, soloist N. Nozy, Concerto pour piano et Orchestre d'Harmonie, soloist J.C. Vanden Eynden. Royal Belgian Guides Orchestra. Conductor Norbert Nozy.

 "Concertos for Saxophone and Symphonic Band" by R. Boutry, M. De Jonghe, A. Verbesselt, F. Erickson. Soloist Norbert Nozy, conductor Walter Boeykens.

 " Jean Absil" Brasilian Rhapsodie, Flemish Rhapsodie, Fantasia-Capriccio (soloist V. Cornil),Rites, Bulgarian Dances. Royal Belgian Guides Orchestra. Conductor Norbert Nozy.

 "Manhattan Pictures", Saint Martin's Suite: J.Van der Roost, J. Curnow: Lochinvar, J. Haderman: Ritual. Royal Belgian Guides Orchestra. Conductor Norbert Nozy.

 "Festive Ouvertures" by Shostakovitch, Berlioz, Lalo, Mendelssohn, Rossini, Verdi, Wagner. Royal Guides Orchestra. Conductor Norbert Nozy.

 "Spanish Music" by Granados, de Falla, (piano Thomas Dieltjens), S. Brotons. Royal Belgian Guides Orchestra. Conductor Norbert Nozy.

 "Gran Partita" W.A.Mozart. Soloists of the Royal Belgian Guides Orchestra. Conductor Norbert Nozy.

 " Igor Stravinsky" Fanfare for a New Theatre, Octet, Symphonie d'Instruments à Vent, Circus Polka, Petrouchka, Ebony Concerto. Royal Belgian Guides Orchestra. Conductor Norbert Nozy.

 "Richard Strauss" Don Juan, Tod und Verklärung, Till Eulenspegel.

 "Hommage à Jean de La Fontaine." Ida Gotkovsky .Mixte Choir Vox Tempore, Boys Choir "Les Pastoureaux". Belgian Guides Orchestra. Conductor Norbert Nozy.

 "Jacqueline Fontyn" Créneaux, Aratoro, Frises, Blake's Mirror, soloist R.A. Morgan. Royal Belgian Guides Orchestra. Conductor Norbert Nozy.

 "Concertos for Clarinet" by Ida Gotkovsky. Soloist Christian Debauve. Royal Belgian Guides Orchestra. Conductor Norbert Nozy.

 "Les Synthétistes" Works by G. Brenta, F. de Bourguignon,(piano M. Durruoglu),R.Bernier, M. Schoemaker, M.Poot, T. De Joncker, J. Strens. Royal Belgian Guides Orchestra. Conductor Norbert Nozy.

 "Maurice Ravel" Alborada del Gracioso, Rhapsodie Espagnole, Daphnis et Chloe, La Valse, Pavane pour une Infante Défunte, Boléro. Brussels Choral Society and Royal Belgian Guides Orchestra. Conductor Norbert Nozy.

 "Ottorino Respighi"  Feste Romane, Fontane di Roma, Pini di Roma. Royal Belgian Guides Orchestra. Conductor Norbert Nozy.

 "Hardy Mertens" Adagio, U Mundu Drentu a Ti, The Three Storms ( soloists J. Claessens, H. Claessens,S. Welters), Lest we forget, Rondo Skolion. Royal Belgian Guides Orchestra. Conductor Norbert Nozy.

 "Musicals" Filmmusic: James Bond, Colonel Bogey, Miss Saigon, Memory, Morricone, West Side Story, Benvenuta, Star Wars, Bolero. Royal Belgian Guides Orchestra. Conductor Norbert Nozy.

 "Live at the Monnaie" F. Chopin, Pianoconcerto nr. 2, soloist A. Vageuner, S. Rachmaninov, Pianoconcerto nr. 3, soloist E. Moguilevsky. Royal Belgian Guides Orchestra. Conductor Norbert Nozy.

 "Live at the Monnaie" M. Ravel, Pianoconcerto in G, soloist Patricia Montero,  S. Rachmaninov, Pianoconcerto nr.2, soloist A. Vaguener. Royal Belgian Guides Orchestra. Conductor Norbert Nozy.

 "Postcard from Singapore" Works by Philip Sparke. Fanfareband of the Royal Netherlands Army. Conductor Norbert Nozy.

 "The 7 Wonders of the Ancient World" by Alex Poelman, H.Berlioz: Les Toyens à Carthage, G.Puccini :Preludio Sinfonico, A. Willering: Septimos. Royal Dutch Band "Johan Willem Friso". Conductor Norbert Nozy.

 "Legacy of the Woods" Works by S. Yagisawa, I. Sakai, K. Tanaka. Royal Netherlands Army Band "Johan Willem Friso. Conductor Norbert Nozy.

 "Bernstein" Symphonic Dances from West Side story, 3 Dance episodes, Divertimento, Prelude, Fugue and Riffs, Slava. Royal Netherlands Army Band "Johan Willem Friso". Conductor Norbert Nozy.

 "ECWO 2016" Oyvind Moe: Cerebral Vortex, David Maslanka: Symphony nr. 4, Maurice Ravel: Daphnis et Chloe. Royal Dutch Wind Orchestra of Thorn. Conductor Norbert Nozy.
 
 "Russian Crownjewels" Shostakovitch: Ouverture on Russian and Kirghiz·Folk Songs, Tchaikovsky: Romeo and Juliet, Pianoconcerto nr.2, soloist A. Vaguener. Royal Dutch Windorchestra of Thorn.Conductor Norbert Nozy.

 "The Winning Concert" European Music Championship 2013. Oliver Waespi: Divertimento, John Mackey: Redline Tango, Albert Roussel: Bacchus et Ariadne. Royal Dutch Wind Orchestra of Thorn. Conductor Norbert Nozy.

 "Mytic Themes" R. Strauss: Don Juan, B.A. Ferrero: Tierra Mittica, Ch. Lindberg: Mandrake in the Corner (soloists Bart Claessens and Jörgen Van Rijen). Royal Dutch Wind Orchestra of Thorn. Conductor Norbert Nozy.

 "Live at the Opera de Lille" Composition Contest Pieces selected by Coups de Vents. Orchestre des Gardiens de la Paix de Paris. Conductor Norbert Nozy.

 "Belgian Works for Saxophone" A. Waignein: Deux Mouvements, P. Gilson: 2nd Concerto,M. Poot: Ballade pour Saxophone, J. Absil: Fantaisie-Caprice, P.Cabus: Facetten voor Saxofoon en strijkers, W. Carron: Pastorale for Soprano Saxophone and Strings. New Flemish Symphony Orchestra. Conductor Fabrice Bollon. Soloist Norbert Nozy.

Audio samples 
 , by Jean-Valentin Bender Royal Symphonic Band of the Belgian Guides], Norbert Nozy, conductor
 , by Hardy Mertens, Royal Symphonic Band of the Belgian Guides, Norbert Nozy, conductor
 , by François van Campenhout, Royal Symphonic Band of the Belgian Guides, Norbert Nozy, conductor
 , by Arthur Prévost, Royal Symphonic Band of the Belgian Guides, Norbert Nozy, conductor
 , by Guillaume Lekeu, Carl Delbart, tuba;

External links 
 Nozy's bio at Maastricht Academy of Music
Officeial Website (in French)

References 
General citations
 Kurtz Myers: Performer Index : Conductors, in: Index to record reviews 1984-1987 : based on material originally published in Notes, quarterly journal of the Music Library Association between 1984 and 1987, G. K. Hall, Boston (1989) 
 Harry R. Gee (1924– ), Saxophone Soloists and Their Music 1844–1985, An Annotated Bibliography, Indiana University Press, Bloomington (1986) 

1952 births
Living people
Belgian conductors (music)
Belgian male musicians
Male conductors (music)
Classical saxophonists
Belgian classical musicians
Academic staff of the Maastricht Academy of Music
University of North Texas College of Music faculty
People from Limburg (Belgium)
21st-century saxophonists
21st-century conductors (music)
21st-century male musicians
Belgian military musicians